Vergassola is an Italian surname. Notable people with the surname include:

Dario Vergassola (born 1957), Italian comedian, actor and singer-songwriter
Massimo Vergassola, Italian physicist and Fellow of the [American Physical Society]
Simone Vergassola (born 1976), Italian former footballer 

Italian-language surnames